Ramu Ustad is a 1971 Bollywood drama film directed by Mohammed Hussain. The film stars Madan Puri and Dara Singh.

Cast
Dara Singh as Ramu
Madan Puri   
Mehmood Jr.   
Jayshree T. as Shaam
Shah Agha

Music
"Hum Toh Tujhse Nain Milake Tere Ho Gaye Re" - Suman Kalyanpur
"O Jana Na Yeh Dil Diwana, Are Haan Jana Na" - Suman Kalyanpur
"Aaya Kaisa Zamana O Baba Duniya Me Pale" - Mohammed Rafi, Sharda
"Piya Piya Piya Mora Man Pyaasa Re" - Suman Kalyanpur

References

External links
 

1971 films
1970s Hindi-language films
1971 drama films
Indian drama films